Čuljak is a Croatian surname.

Notable people with the name include:

 Dijana Čuljak (born 1968), Croatian television host
 Ivica Čuljak (1960–1992), Croatian musician best known as Satan Panonski
 Krešimir Čuljak (born 1970), Croatian rower
 Tomislav Čuljak (born 1987), Croatian football player

Croatian surnames